Mayo, Florida is a town and the only municipality in Lafayette County, Florida, United States. The population was 1,237 at the 2010 census. It is the county seat of Lafayette County. In August 2018, Mayo temporarily changed its name to Miracle Whip as an advertising stunt with Kraft's Miracle Whip brand.

Geography

Climate

Demographics

As of the census of 2000, there were 988 people, 338 households, and 228 families residing in the town. The racial makeup of the town was 61.23% White, 27.43% African American, 0.40% Native American, 0.10% Pacific Islander, 9.62% from other races, and 1.21% from two or more races. Hispanic or Latino of any race were 16.80% of the population.

There were 338 households, out of which 33.1% had children under the age of 18 living with them, 42.3% were married couples living together, 19.2% had a female householder with no husband present, and 32.5% were non-families. 28.4% of all households were made up of individuals, and 13.3% had someone living alone who was 65 years of age or older. The average household size was 2.70 and the average family size was 3.23.

In the town, the population was spread out, with 28.2% under the age of 18, 11.1% from 18 to 24, 24.8% from 25 to 44, 21.7% from 45 to 64, and 14.2% who were 65 years of age or older. The median age was 33 years. For every 100 females, there were 96.0 males. For every 100 females age 18 and over, there were 92.1 males.

The median income for a household in the town was $25,398, and the median income for a family was $28,438. Males had a median income of $21,802 versus $17,697 for females. The per capita income for the town was $13,298. About 30.6% of families and 34.6% of the population were below the poverty line, including 42.5% of those under age 18 and 54.7% of those age 65 or over.

Historic buildings and structures

Historic buildings and structures in Mayo include:
 The 1883 Old Lafayette County Courthouse, now a bed and breakfast;
 The 1888 Old Mayo Free Press Building, just south of the Old Courthouse;
 The 1908 Lafayette County Courthouse;
 The 1880s House of the Seven Gables and
 The 1915 M. Pico Building on the corner of Monroe and Main streets.

Notable people

 Kerwin Bell, former college and professional quarterback and collegiate coach
 Bill Birchfield, lawyer, Florida state representative and self-described, "Duke of Mayo"
 Reggie McGrew, former college and professional defensive line for University of Florida and The 49ers
 Herbert Perry, former football & baseball player University of Florida. Also MLB player with Indians, Rays, White Sox, and Rangers.
 Charles Strong, was lynched on January 17, 1922, in Mayo
 Dan White, (March 25, 1908 – July 7, 1980), American actor in vaudeville, theater, radio, film and television
 Ricky Nattiel, former college and professional football player, Wide receiver, for the University of Florida and the  Denver Broncos.

References

External links

Mayo Free Press newspaper that serves Mayo, Florida is available in full-text with images in Florida Digital Newspaper Library
Mayo, Florida heritage travel website with information about Mayo, Florida.

Towns in Lafayette County, Florida
County seats in Florida
Towns in Florida